Bohdan Karkovskyi (born 29 January 1988) is a professional Ukrainian football defender who played for the Ukrainian Premier League club Volyn Lutsk.

He made his debut for FC Volyn Lutsk played as substituted in the game against FC Lviv on 18 March 2008 in the Ukrainian First League. Karkovskyi for a long time did not play due to injuries.

References

External links 

1988 births
Living people
Sportspeople from Lviv
Ukrainian footballers
Ukrainian Premier League players
FC Volyn Lutsk players
Association football defenders